South Korean boy group Boyfriend have released four studio albums (one of which was re-released), seven extended plays, two compilation albums, and twenty-four singles. Formed in 2011 by Starship Entertainment, they debuted on Mnet's M!Countdown on May 26, 2011 with their debut single "Boyfriend".

Albums

Studio albums

Compilation albums

Reissues

Extended plays

Singles

Collaboration singles

Soundtrack appearances

Videography

DVDs

Music videos

Notes

References

K-pop music group discographies
Discographies of South Korean artists